The Men's Bantamweight Weightlifting Event (– 56 kg) is the second-lightest men's event at the Olympic weightlifting competition, limiting competitors to a maximum of 52 kilograms of body mass. The competition took place on 27 July 1992 in the Pavelló de l'Espanya Industrial.

Each lifter performed in both the snatch and clean and jerk lifts, with the final score being the sum of the lifter's best result in each. The athlete received three attempts in each of the two lifts; the score for the lift was the heaviest weight successfully lifted.  Ties were broken by the lifter with the lightest body weight.

Results

References

External links
Official Olympic report

Weightlifting at the 1992 Summer Olympics